Yeban gesheng is the title of several Chinese-language films:
 Song at Midnight (1937) 
 The Mid-Nightmare (1962—Part I), (1963—Part II)
 The Phantom Lover (1995)